Phytolacca acinosa, the Indian pokeweed, is a species of flowering plant in the family Phytolaccaceae. It is native to temperate eastern Asia; the Himalayas, most of China, Vietnam to Japan, and has been widely introduced to Europe. The species was originally described by William Roxburgh in 1814.

Range 
When the species was originally described it was considered a plant located to Nepal. Currently, the plant is considered native to countries surrounding the Himalayas and introduced to large parts of Europe and parts of the United States (Wisconsin).

Similar species (look-a-likes) 
Due to overlap in diagnostic feature Phytolacca acinosa can be confused with Phytolacca americana, Phytolacca latbenia or Phytolacca polyandra.

Natural products 
Phytolacca acinosa is the source of four Flavones, four, oleanane derivatives  and six Triterpenoid saponins

Flavones 
 Cochliophilin A
 Cochliophilin B
 6-methoxy-7-hydroxy flavone
 6,7-methylenedioxy-4-hydroxypeltogynan-7′-one

Triterpenoid saponins 
 esculentoside A
 esculentoside B
 esculentoside C
 esculentoside D 
 esculentoside H
 esculentoside T

References

acinosa
Flora of West Himalaya
Flora of Nepal
Flora of East Himalaya
Flora of Assam (region)
Flora of Myanmar
Flora of Vietnam
Flora of Tibet
Flora of Manchuria
Flora of North-Central China
Flora of South-Central China
Flora of Southeast China
Flora of Eastern Asia
Plants described in 1814
Taxa named by William Roxburgh